The Ben-Hur Motor Company was incorporated in 1916 in the state of Delaware, with the cars being built by L. L. Allyn in Willoughby, Ohio.

Features
 Chassis with a wheelbase of 126 inches
 Buda six cylinder engine with splash and forced feed oiling system
 Bosch high-tension ignition magneto
 Westinghouse separate motor for starting
 Disc clutch and selective sliding gear set with three speeds forward and reverse
 19 gallon gasoline tank is mounted on rear with a two-gallon reserve tank
 Timken axles are used in front and rear with wire wheels on which 35x4 tires are mounted.

Prices
 Five and seven-passenger touring - $1875
 Seven-passenger Sedan - $2750
 Four-passenger Roadster - $1875

Ben-Hur exhibited a cloverleaf roadster at the 1917 New York Auto Show.  In February 1918 Allyn announced that between 30 and 40 cars had been shipped to dealers, and that plans called for five to ten cars a week for the time being, owing to the difficulty in securing bodies. The company had a factory with a capacity of building 20 cars per day. A meeting was scheduled in March to increase capitalisation, but by May 1918 the company was in receivership.

Notes

External links
 1917 seven-passenger touring car

Cars of the United States
1910s cars